Jerome McDougle (born December 15, 1978) is a former American football defensive end. He was drafted by the Philadelphia Eagles 15th overall in the 2003 NFL Draft. McDougle played college football at the University of Miami. He has also played for the New York Giants.

College career
McDougle was a standout defensive player at the University of Miami. Among his collegiate accomplishments, he helped lead the University of Miami to its 12–0 national championship season in 2001.

Professional career

Philadelphia Eagles
McDougle was drafted by the Philadelphia Eagles with the 15th overall selection in the first round of the 2003 NFL Draft. The Eagles traded up 15 spots to obtain McDougle, making him the first University of Miami player to be drafted by the Eagles since Jerome Brown, whose promising NFL career was cut short by a fatal 1992 car accident.

With the Eagles, McDougle was plagued by injuries. In the final 2003 pre-season game, he sustained ankle, knee and hip injuries during a game against the New York Jets, forcing him to miss eight games of the 2003 season. During the 2004 season, he was diagnosed with an irregular heartbeat, and later he suffered a knee sprain in a game against the Dallas Cowboys, missing five games during the season.

During the 2005 offseason, McDougle was shot during an armed robbery of his home. Complications from the shooting and surgery left him out for the entire 2005 season. McDougle fully recovered and joined the Eagles at their 2006 training camp practices. He performed well in pre-season outings, recording an impressive sack of former collegiate teammate Ken Dorsey in the Eagles' pre-season game against the Cleveland Browns. On August 15, however, Eagles coach Andy Reid announced that McDougle had sustained fractures to two ribs in pre-season practices and would require approximately three weeks for recuperation. He was reactivated in September 2006.

McDougle's pass rushing and run defense capabilities were expected to be an important part of the 2006 Eagles defense, which featured high levels of substitutions of defensive linemen in situational-oriented defenses. McDougle's actions on the field proved costly to the Eagles during a controversial Eagles 23–21 loss to the Tampa Bay Buccaneers on October 22, 2006. In the fourth quarter of a closely contested game played in 105-degree Tampa Bay heat, McDougle closed in on Buccaneer quarterback Bruce Gradkowski, dropping him for a nine-yard loss in a critical quarterback sack. As McDougle brought Gradkowski to the ground at Raymond James Stadium, however, he appeared to grab Gradkowski's face mask, resulting in a 15-yard intentional face-masking penalty against the Eagles. The 15-yard nature of the penalty was questionable, with replays showing that McDougle's grasp of Gradkowski's face mask appeared unintentional, which, if true, should have resulted in only a five-yard penalty.

Seeing that he had been penalized 15 yards, McDougle kicked the referee's flag in anger, resulting in an additional 15-yard unsportsmanlike conduct penalty, for a total of 30 yards in penalties. The two penalties incurred by McDougle greatly enhanced the Buccaneers' field position, leading to a Buccaneers field goal, which proved the difference in the game's outcome, which ultimately was won by Tampa Bay on a 62-yard Buccaneers' field goal (the third longest in NFL history) as time expired.

In 2007, McDougle was again injured, tearing his triceps, this time in the Eagles' pre-season opener against the Baltimore Ravens; he did not return during the 2007 season. On August 30, 2008, the Eagles released him during final cuts, ending a high-expectations tenure with the Eagles plagued by injuries and disappointments.

New York Giants
A day after being released from the Eagles, McDougle was signed by the New York Giants on August 31, 2008. He became a free agent after the season, and was not signed by another team.

Personal life
He is the younger brother of NFL offensive lineman Stockar McDougle.
On July 28, 2005, just four days before McDougle was scheduled to arrive for the Eagles 2005 training camp in Bethlehem, Pennsylvania, he was shot in the abdomen during a robbery in Miami, Florida. Following the shooting, McDougle was flown by helicopter to Miami's Jackson Memorial Hospital, where he underwent emergency surgery by Dr. David Shatz, a trauma surgeon at the University of Miami.

NFL statistics

Key
 GP: games played
 COMB: combined tackles
 TOTAL: total tackles
 AST: assisted tackles
 SACK: sacks
 FF: forced fumbles
 FR: fumble recoveries
 FR YDS: fumble return yards 
 INT: interceptions
 IR YDS: interception return yards
 AVG IR: average interception return
 LNG: longest interception return
 TD: interceptions returned for touchdown
 PD: passes defensed

References

1978 births
Living people
People from Pompano Beach, Florida
Players of American football from Florida
African-American players of American football
American football defensive ends
Hinds Eagles football players
Miami Hurricanes football players
Philadelphia Eagles players
New York Giants players
American shooting survivors
Blanche Ely High School alumni
21st-century African-American sportspeople
20th-century African-American sportspeople
Sportspeople from Broward County, Florida
Ed Block Courage Award recipients